The 1996–97 Russian Superleague season was the first season of the Russian Superleague, the top level of ice hockey in Russia. 26 teams participated in the league, and Torpedo Yaroslavl won the championship.

First round

Western Conference

Eastern Conference

Final round

Playoffs

3rd place: Metallurg Magnitogorsk − Salavat Yulaev Ufa 1:2

Relegation

External links
Season on hockeyarchives.ru

Russian Superleague seasons
1996–97 in Russian ice hockey leagues